Kevin Collins (born 6 July 1954) is a New Zealand cricketer. He played in one first-class and two List A matches for Canterbury from 1976 to 1979.

See also
 List of Canterbury representative cricketers

References

External links
 

1954 births
Living people
New Zealand cricketers
Canterbury cricketers
Cricketers from Christchurch